The Shijiazhuang railway station is the main railway station of Shijiazhuang, the capital of Hebei Province of China. Over the city's history, the name has been applied to several different facilities located in the main Beijing-Guangzhou railway corridor. The current Shijiazhuang railway station was opened in December 2012; it is one of the very few stations in this railway corridor that serve both the ("conventional") Beijing–Guangzhou railway and the new Beijing–Guangzhou high-speed railway.

Besides trains running along the two north-south Beijing-Guangzhou lines, Shijiazhuang railway station is also served by many (but not all) trains going east or west, along the Qingdao-Jinan-Dezhou-Shijiazhuang-Taiyuan corridor, which includes both a  conventional railway and the Shijiazhuang–Taiyuan high-speed railway. However, some of the trains in the east-west corridor do not stop at Shijiazhuang railway station; instead bypassing the city center, stopping at the smaller Shijiazhuang North railway station.

In January 2013, a typical daily schedule listed 265 trains originating, terminating, or passing through Shijiazhuang railway station.

Shijiazhuang railway station is by far the busiest train station in Hebei's capital region. E.g., during the 4-day holiday period from December 31, 2012 through January 3, 2013,  198,000 passengers departed from this station, out of the 279,000 passengers that departed from all station of the Greater Shijiazhuang taken together.

History

The first railway station at what was to become the city of Shijiazhuang opened in 1903.

(The border between the two districts runs along the railway). This station was closed on December 20, 2012, simultaneously with the opening of the new Shijiazhuang railway station. (See 石家庄站 (1987－2012年))

The construction of the present-day Shijiazhuang railway station started in June 2010.; it was opened on December 21, 2012, just in time for the opening of the Beijing–Shijiazhuang and Shijiazhuang–Zhengzhou sections of the Beijing–Guangzhou high-speed railway.

To avoid confusion between the pre- and post-2012 stations of the same name, they are sometimes referred to as the "Old (老) Shijiazhuang Station" and the "New (新) Shijiazhuang Station".

Unlike most other cities along the Beijing–Guangzhou High-Speed Railway, where the high-speed line is routed away from city centers, and high-speed train stations are separate (and, usually, quite distant) from the cities' conventional railway stations,
in Shijiazhuang a decision was made to construct a common station for the high-speed and conventional rail lines. This required extensive tunneling, with a 5-km long 6-track tunnel constructed under the city.

 This was the first time tunneling (instead of e.g. constructing an elevated line) was used to run a high-speed railway through a city in China.

The new Shijiazhuang railway station is located about 3 km south of the old station, just within the city's Second Ring Road. This site is also near the border of Qiaoxi and Qiaodong Districts.

The stations is currently served by the Shijiazhuang Metro Line 2 and Line 3.

References

Railway stations in Hebei
Railway stations in China opened in 1903
Shijiazhuang